Cobham Intermediate School is a state intermediate school in the northwestern Christchurch, New Zealand suburb of Burnside.

Cobham was originally named Fendalton Intermediate. However, there was confusion between the school and Fendalton Open Air School, so the governor-general of New Zealand, Viscount Cobham, allowed the school to use his name. At the end of term 1 in 2011 long-running principal Trevor Beaton left Cobham Intermediate to retire. Scott Thelning from Mt. Pleasant School took over as principal in Term 3, 2011.

In March 2018 Cobham student Maia Devereaux invited Women's Minister Julie Anne Genter to come and talk about the gender pay gap to the room 11 and 12 students.

Cobham today

Cobham is currently the largest intermediate school in the South Island and has a total attendance of 726 students.

Achievements

In 2005, Cobham won the Cantamath competition (a mathematics competition for schools around the Canterbury region) in both the year 7 and 8 competition. Many musicians and singers from this school participate in the Lions Primary School Music Festival.

Notable alumni
 Corey Anderson – New Zealand cricketer
 John Key – New Zealand Prime Minister (2008–2016)
 Tom Latham – New Zealand cricketer
 Hayley Westenra – New Zealand pop opera singer

Notes

External links

Intermediate schools in New Zealand
Schools in Christchurch